Yellow Jack is a 1938 film released by Metro-Goldwyn-Mayer based on the 1934 play Yellow Jack.  Both were co-written by Sidney Howard and Paul de Kruif (the former a Pulitzer- and Oscar-winning playwright and screenwriter; the latter a well-known microbiologist and author).

Produced and directed by the legendary Guthrie McClintic, the original Broadway play co-starred James Stewart and Sam Levene and opened at the Martin Beck Theatre, March 6, 1934. Stewart's performance as Sergeant John O'Hara in the Broadway production of Yellow Jack attracted the attention of Hollywood along with a MGM contract. When Yellow Jack was filmed, Stewart was unavailable and replaced by Robert Montgomery. Sam Levene was the only member of the original Broadway cast to also appear in the movie. The supporting cast also features Lewis Stone, Andy Devine, Henry Hull, Charles Coburn and Buddy Ebsen.

Plot
The plot line follows the events of the well-known "Walter Reed Boards", in which Major Walter Reed of the United States Army worked to diagnose and treat yellow fever (called “yellow jack”) in Cuba in 1898–1900. The U.S. Army Medical Corps doctors studied the theory by the Cuban doctor Carlos Finlay that the disease was caused by bites of infected Aedes aegypti mosquitoes, a concept which had been ridiculed. The dramas portrayed the soldiers who volunteered to be  human "guinea pigs" by allowing themselves to be bitten and contract the deadly disease, for which no cure was then known. (See History of yellow fever.)

Cast
Robert Montgomery as John O'Hara
Virginia Bruce as Frances Blake
Lewis Stone as Major Walter Reed
Andy Devine as Charlie Spill
Henry Hull as Dr. Jesse Lazear
Charles Coburn as Dr. Carlos Finlay
Buddy Ebsen as 'Jellybeans'
Henry O'Neill as Gorgas
Janet Beecher as Miss Macdade
William Henry as Breen
Alan Curtis as Brinkerhof
Sam Levene as Busch
Stanley Ridges as Dr. James Carroll
Phillip Terry as Ferguson
Jonathan Hale as Major General Leonard Wood

Tribute to volunteers

The movie ends with the following tribute to the real volunteers of the Yellow Jack experiment:

Yellow Jack celebrates what these men did, rather than what they were. That their heroism, however, should not go unrecorded, their true names are here given:
 Robert P. Cooke
 Levi E. Folk
 Warren G. Jernegan
 John R. Kissenger
 John J. Moran

Television adaptations
The play and screenplay were adapted for television by Celanese Theatre (1952) and Producers' Showcase (1955), in episodes titled Yellow Jack.

Radio adaptation
Yellow Jack was presented on Philip Morris Playhouse September 5, 1941.

References

External links 
 
 

1938 films
1938 drama films
Films based on non-fiction books
American films based on plays
Military medicine in the United States
Films directed by George B. Seitz
Cuba in fiction
Metro-Goldwyn-Mayer films
American black-and-white films
American drama films
1930s English-language films
1930s American films
Films about mosquitoes
Films about the United States Army
Human experimentation in fiction